Benapole Land Port, is the largest land port of Bangladesh located in Benapole town of Sharsha Upazila in the Jessore District. This port is used to export-import good with India through Benapole-Petrapole border. This port is governed by Bangladesh Land Port Authority. About 90% of the imported Indian goods enter Bangladesh through this port.

History 
Benapole land port was established as a Land Customs station and later it was turned into a Customs Division in 1984. It was transformed into a Custom House in 1997 and in 2009 new buildings were constructed in the location and Benapole Customs and Immigration Check post started its operation since then.

See also
 Benapole Border Crossing

References 

Land Port
Government agencies of Bangladesh
Organisations based in Khulna
1984 establishments in Bangladesh